B. Meenakshipuram is a panchayat town in Bodinayakanur Taluk, Theni district Located in Madurai Region in The state of Tamil Nadu, India.

Demographics
 India census, B. Meenakshipuram had a population of 7207. Males constitute 50% of the population and females 50%. B. Meenakshipuram has an average literacy rate of 55%, lower than the national average of 59.5%; with 60% of the males and 40% of females literate. 10% of the population is under 6 years of age.

References

Cities and towns in Theni district